Gerakan Tanah Air (GTA, Homeland Movement or Homeland Party) is a newly-formed alliance of Malay political parties, founded in August 2022 by former Prime Minister of Malaysia Mahathir Mohamad.

Mahathir had announced during the coalition's founding that GTA will contest in the next Malaysian general election against the incumbent ruling coalition Barisan Nasional. On 6 September 2022, the coalition submitted registration documents to the Registrar of Societies (RoS) to apply for registration. The coalition failed to win any parliament seat in the 2022 General Election.

History
On 4 August 2022, PEJUANG Chairman Mahathir Mohamad announced launch of Gerakan Tanah Air (GTA) coalition which aims to keep the country safe and stable by reducing the current gap between races. He said, it does not mean that the movement is racist but rather it is to focus against a Malay party that has gone astray at the moment. The basis of the establishment of the Homeland Movement was not to seize the property of the non-Malay community or prevent them from trying to get wealth, but rather it sought to correct the economy of the Malay community. GTA comprises four parties – PEJUANG, Parti Bumiputera Perkasa Malaysia (Putra), Barisan Jemaah Islamiah Se-Malaysia (Berjasa) and the Parti Perikatan India Muslim Nasional (Iman).

On 23 September 2022, Gerakan Tanah Air's (GTA) application to register as an official political party coalition has received preliminary approval from the Registrar of Society (RoS). 

On 2 November 2022, Gerakan Tanah Air's (GTA) announced the 121 Parliamentary candidates who will compete to represent the movement in the 15th General Election (GE-15).  However, GTA failed to win all 121 Parliamentary chair.

On 14 January 2023, PEJUANG left GTA. PEJUANG President Mukhriz Mahathir said PEJUANG need focus on strengthening the party before adding value to any coalition. The decision was made after taking into account the views of the representatives in the second PEJUANG General Assembly, following the party's heavy defeat in the past 15th General Election (GE15). However, Mukhriz said PEJUANG took the stance of remaining open to hold any negotiations with any existing political coalition in the run-up to the State Election (PRN) which is expected to take place this year.

Leadership structure
Interim founding leadership of GTA:
 Chairman:
 Tun Dr. Mahathir bin Mohamad (PUTRA)

 Deputy Chairman:
 Ustaz Zamani Ibrahim (BERJASA)
 Dato' Paduka Ibrahim Ali (PUTRA)
 Datuk Mohammed Mosin Abdul Razak (IMAN)
 Aminuddin Yahaya (Gagasan Bangsa)

 Women Chief:
 Vacant
 Youth Chief :
 Nasrul Ali Hasan Abdul Latif (PUTRA)
 Women's Youth Chief:
 Azliza Rajain (BERJASA)
 Chief Secretary:
 Marzuki Yahya (direct member)
 Treasurer:
 Mohamed Ismail (BERJASA)
 Information Chief:
 Nizam Mahsar
 Executive Council Members:
 Dato' Mohd Rosli Ramli (BERJASA)
 Tan Sri Dato' Mohd Khalid Yunus (PUTRA)
 Datuk Mohamed Ismail Ibrahim (IMAN)
 En. Borhan Ahmad Zakaria (PUTRA)
 Dr. Amir Hamzah (IMAN)
 En. Azriq Rosman (BERJASA)
 Prof. Dr. Murad Merican - Scholar
 Tuan Hj. Ahmad Zakie Ahmad Shariff - Financial professional
 En. Syed Hassan Syed Ali - NGO figure
 Dr. Nazmi Desa - Religious scholar
 En. Khaidir Ahmad - Environment and grassroot (marhaen) activist
 Dr. Farhan Rusli - Scholar and professional
 Datuk Dr. Abdul Halim Sher - Doctor of Medicine

Member parties
At its founding, it consists of 3 member parties:

Former member parties 

 Homeland Fighter's Party (PEJUANG), (2022–2023)

Elected representatives 
As of the 15th General Election, neither of the parties has elected representatives in the parliament.

Parliament of Malaysia - Dewan Rakyat

State legislative assemblies

General election results

State election results

See also
 List of political parties in Malaysia
 2020-22 Malaysian political crisis

References

Political party alliances in Malaysia
Political parties established in 2022
2022 establishments in Malaysia
Malaysian nationalism